Mylothris spica, the spica dotted border is a butterfly in the family Pieridae. It is found in Ghana and Angola. The habitat consists of wet forests.

The larvae feed on Santalales species.

Subspecies
Mylothris spica spica (Ghana)
Mylothris spica gabela Berger, 1979 (Angola)

References

Seitz, A. Die Gross-Schmetterlinge der Erde 13: Die Afrikanischen Tagfalter. Plate XIII 10

Butterflies described in 1884
Pierini
Butterflies of Africa